Eriocoma lemmonii is a species of grass known by the common name Lemmon's needlegrass. It is native to western North America, where its distribution extends from British Columbia to southern California.

It may be hairless, hairy, or woolly.

This is a very drought-tolerant grass that can be found in dry areas, such as sunny grasslands and savannas. It can also grow in relatively low-fertility soils. The subspecies pubescens is a serpentine soils endemic.

References

External links
USDA Plants Profile
Jepson Manual Treatment

lemmonii
Bunchgrasses of North America
Grasses of the United States
Native grasses of California
Flora of the Cascade Range
Flora of the Great Basin
Flora of the Klamath Mountains
Flora of the Sierra Nevada (United States)
Flora of British Columbia
Flora of Idaho
Flora of Oregon
Flora of Nevada
Flora of Utah
Natural history of the California chaparral and woodlands
Natural history of the California Coast Ranges
Natural history of the Peninsular Ranges
Natural history of the San Francisco Bay Area
Natural history of the Transverse Ranges